Henny Lindorff Buckhøj (29 April 1902 – 18 December 1979) was a Danish film actress. She appeared in 19 films between 1944 and 1970. She was born and died in Denmark.

Filmography
 Det bødes der for (1944)
 Elly Petersen (1944)
 Billet mrk. (1946)
 Ditte Menneskebarn (1946)
 Røverne fra Rold (1947)
 Unge piger forsvinder i København (1951)
 Rekrut 67 Petersen (1952)
 The Old Mill on Mols (1953)
 Himlen er blå (1954)
 Den kloge mand - 1956 (1956)
 Seksdagesløbet (1958)
 Guld og grønne skove (1958)
 Baronessen fra benzintanken (1960)
 Den kære familie (1962)
 Landmandsliv (1965)
 Den røde rubin (1969)
 Ta' lidt solskin (1969)
 Hurra for de blå husarer (1970)

External links

1902 births
1979 deaths
Danish film actresses
20th-century Danish actresses